Acrylyl-CoA reductase (NADPH) is an enzyme with systematic name propanoyl-CoA:NADP+ oxidoreductase. This enzyme catalyses the following chemical reaction

 propanoyl-CoA + NADP+  acryloyl-CoA + NADPH + H+

This enzyme catalyses a step in the 3-hydroxypropionate/4-hydroxybutyrate cycle, an autotrophic CO2 fixation pathway found in some Thermoacidophilic archaea.

References

External links 
 

EC 1.3.1